Mary Littlejohn (26 May 1903 – September 1988) was a Canadian figure skater. She competed in the ladies' singles event at the 1932 Winter Olympics.

References

External links
 

1903 births
1988 deaths
Canadian female single skaters
Olympic figure skaters of Canada
Figure skaters at the 1932 Winter Olympics
Sportspeople from Ontario